Xtra Bass is a free week-long drum and bass tour of the UK hosted by the BBC's digital radio station BBC Radio 1Xtra. 2007 is the fifth year of the tour and features appearances by well established drum and bass djs such as DJ Bailey, L Double, Fabio & Grooverider and Crissy Criss among others.

The tour covers 7 cities in 7 days, and the itinerary for 2007 is as follows:
5 Mar 2007  	 	Oxford, England
6 Mar 2007 	        Bristol, England
7 Mar 2007 	        Birmingham, England
8 Mar 2007 	        Sheffield, England
9 Mar 2007 	        Glasgow, Scotland
9 Mar 2007 	        London, England
10 Mar 2007 	        Swansea, Wales
11 Mar 2007 	        London, England

See also
List of electronic music festivals
Live electronic music

External links
 BBC Radio 1Xtra Official Site.

BBC Radio
Electronic music festivals in the United Kingdom
Drum and bass events
Electronic music event management companies
Music festivals established in 2002